The Andiysky okrug was a district (okrug) of the Dagestan Oblast of the Caucasus Viceroyalty of the Russian Empire. The area of the Andiysky okrug is included in contemporary Dagestan of the Russian Federation. The district's administrative centre was Botlikh.

Administrative divisions 
The subcounties (uchastoks) of the Andiysky okrug were as follows:

Demographics

Russian Empire Census 
The majority of the population indicated Avar to be their mother tongue.

Kavkazskiy kalendar 

Notes

References

Bibliography 

Okrugs of Dagestan Oblast